This is a list of Scooby-Doo characters. Scooby-Doo is an American animated franchise based around several animated television series and animated films, as well as live action movies. There are five main characters in the franchise: Scooby-Doo, Norville "Shaggy" Rogers, Fred Jones, Daphne Blake, and Velma Dinkley—known as "Mystery Incorporated". The original series, Scooby-Doo, Where Are You!, premiered in 1969, and has spawned many follow-up series, and several direct-to-DVD movies.

Mystery Incorporated

Scooby-Doo

Scooby-Doo is the eponymous character in the Scooby-Doo animated television series created by Joe Ruby and Ken Spears alongside the popular American animation company Hanna-Barbera. Scooby-Doo is the pet and lifelong companion of Shaggy Rogers and in many iterations, including the original series, is regarded as a unique anthropomorphic Great Dane dog who is able to speak in broken English, unlike most other dogs in his reality, and usually puts the letter R in front of words spoken. Other incarnations, such as A Pup Named Scooby-Doo, present talking dogs like Scooby as quite common.

The head of children's programming at CBS, Fred Silverman, came up with the character's name from the syllables "doo-be-doo-be-doo" in Frank Sinatra's hit song "Strangers in the Night".

From 1969 to 1994, Scooby was voiced by Don Messick. In the 1997 episode of Johnny Bravo, Scooby was voiced by Hadley Kay. From 1998 to 2001, he was voiced by Scott Innes, who also voiced the character in video game projects (including PC, DVD and board games), commercials and some toys until 2008. In Scooby-Doo and Scooby-Doo 2: Monsters Unleashed, Scooby was voiced by Neil Fanning. Scooby is currently (2002–present) voiced by Frank Welker (the voice of Fred Jones). For parody versions, Scooby was voiced by Mark Hamill in Jay and Silent Bob Strike Back and Seth Green and Dave Coulier in Robot Chicken.

Shaggy Rogers

Norville "Shaggy" Rogers is a fictional character from the American animated television series Scooby-Doo, about the adventures of four crime-solving teenagers and Shaggy's pet Great Dane, Scooby-Doo. Shaggy is a cowardly slacker more interested in eating than solving mysteries. He is the only Scooby-Doo character (besides Scooby) to appear in all iterations of the franchise.

From 1969 to 1997, Shaggy was voiced by Casey Kasem; he would return to voice him again from 2002 to 2009. In Scooby-Doo on Zombie Island, Shaggy was voiced by Billy West. From 1999 to 2001, he was voiced by Scott Innes, who also voiced Shaggy in video game projects (including PC, DVD and board games), commercials and some toys until 2009. In Shaggy & Scooby-Doo Get a Clue!, Shaggy was voiced by Scott Menville. Shaggy is currently (2010–present) being voiced by Matthew Lillard, who played Shaggy in the live-action theatrical films. He was portrayed by Nick Palatas in the Cartoon Network prequel films, Scooby-Doo! The Mystery Begins (2009) and Scooby-Doo! Curse of the Lake Monster (2010). Will Forte voices Shaggy as an adult with Iain Armitage voicing his younger self in the theatrical animated film Scoob!.

Fred Jones

Sometimes called "Freddie", he wears a blue and/or white shirt (which is sometimes worn under a white shirt, sweater, or jacket) and blue jeans. In the original depictions, Fred wears a 16 1/2 size orange ascot. In the 1990s direct-to-video movies and in the 2000s series What's New, Scooby-Doo?, Fred's outfit was given an update, with the removal of his orange ascot and two blue stripes added to his sleeves. He is often shown constructing various Rube Goldberg traps for villains, which Scooby-Doo and/or Shaggy would often set off by mistake, causing the villain to be captured another way. Fred usually takes the lead in solving mysteries. When searching for clues, Fred and Daphne usually go together with Velma coming along, but sometimes Fred and Daphne would pair off, having Velma go with Shaggy and Scooby.

In A Pup Named Scooby-Doo, Fred was depicted as being somewhat less intelligent, believing in legends such as Bigfoot and mole people, and liked reading a magazine called The National Exaggerator. In each episode, Fred would (usually wrongly) blame the crime on the neighbourhood bully Red Herring (a play on the idiom red herring). In his teenage version, he is shown to have many interests (obsessions for traps, martial arts, wrestling, and weight lifting). He is shown to be hopeless at speaking any language other than English. In an episode of What's New, Scooby-Doo?, Fred is learning to speak French - badly - and Daphne suggests he just sticks to saying "oui oui", to which he replies, "I already did that before we left the hotel". He is typically shown to be oblivious to Daphne's romantic interests, while at the same time falling for other girls.

In the episode "The Song of Mystery" from Scooby-Doo! Mystery Incorporated, he is called Fredrick by his tutor Mary-Ann Geerdon. However, in Scooby-Doo! Adventures: The Mystery Map he is called Fredward.

Fred is voiced by Frank Welker, who has retained this role throughout every incarnation of each series where Fred is portrayed as a teenager from 1969 to 1983 and again since 1997. In A Pup Named Scooby-Doo, (where he is portrayed as a child) he was voiced by former child actor Carl Steven.                 

He was portrayed by Freddie Prinze Jr. in the 2002-2004 live-action films and by Robbie Amell in the Cartoon Network prequel films, Scooby-Doo! The Mystery Begins and Scooby-Doo! Curse of the Lake Monster. 

Zac Efron voices Fred as an adult while Pierce Gagnon voices his younger self in the theatrical animated film Scoob!.

Daphne Blake

Together with her other teenage companions, Fred Jones, Shaggy Rogers, Velma Dinkley, and Shaggy's pet Great Dane Scooby-Doo, Daphne would engage in solving various mysteries. Daphne was portrayed as the enthusiastic, but clumsy and danger-prone (hence her nickname "Danger-Prone Daphne" revealed by her cousin, Shannon, being danger-prone is a Blake family trait in Scooby-Doo! and the Loch Ness Monster) member of the gang, who always follows her intuition. She serves as the damsel in distress and would occasionally get kidnapped, tied up, and left imprisoned. Scooby and Shaggy usually save her, but sometimes Fred and Velma or even the whole gang do it. But as the franchise went on, she became a stronger, more independent character, who can take care of herself. Daphne's character is the most developed in the starring cast, going from a klutzy teenager to a successful journalist to an ingenuous fashionista to a black belt martial artist. Daphne is also seen as the moral support in adaptations such as Mystery Incorporated. When Scooby is nowhere to be found, Daphne also shouts "Scooby-Doo! Where are you?!". She occasionally helps the rest of the gang capture the villain by using some random, yet helpful, accessories she has at the moment. For example, in one episode, the gang is tied to posts by ropes, so Daphne pulls out her credit card and slices the ropes in half, leaving her free to untie the other members of the gang.

During the series' fourth incarnation, Scooby-Doo and Scrappy-Doo, some of the episodes focused on Daphne. In the episode "Shiver and Shake, That Demon's a Snake", Daphne buys an idol that is cursed by the snake demon. On the sailboat, the snake demon attacks Daphne and demands an idol to return. Daphne throws it to Scooby, Shaggy and Scrappy. In the episode "The Scary Sky Skeleton", Daphne is reunited with her old friend, Wendy. In the episode "I Left My Neck in San Francisco", Daphne becomes sick and she's unable to help the gang to solve the mystery about the Lady Vampiress of the Bay. Due to the vampire's look, Daphne's unseen reflection in the mirror, the bat flying around Daphne's bed and herself returning to bed a little later, Scooby, Shaggy and Scrappy are convinced that Daphne is a vampiress. When the vampiress is revealed to be Lefty Callahan, Scooby, Shaggy and Scrappy realize they made a mistake with suspecting Daphne and she's feeling well again.

Her usual appearance consists of a purple dress, pink pantyhose, purple shoes, and a green scarf. In Scooby-Doo and the Cyber Chase, she wore a purple and green three-piece suit with matching shoes. As a child, she wore a pink sweater, red skirt, and pink pantyhose with white go-go boots. In The 13 Ghosts of Scooby-Doo, she wore some other purple clothes with purple pants and purple high heels.

While not as clever as Velma, Daphne would always solve her problems in a different way. The character later became more confident and started playing a more active role as time went on, a result of changing attitudes towards women during the 1970s and 1980s. In What's New, Scooby-Doo?, Daphne has also been known to open locks or do other tasks.

In the movie Scooby-Doo on Zombie Island, Daphne as a young adult, had a very successful investigative TV series called Coast to Coast with Daphne Blake on a fictional channel called "Americana", which the show had aired on for two seasons. The producer of the show was Fred Jones, with who she began a relationship with within the film's ending.

Throughout the various incarnations of the character, there has been speculation that Daphne and Fred had an attraction toward each other. This is emphasized in Scooby-Doo! Mystery Incorporated. Throughout the first season, they are shown to be actively dating with Daphne showing more of her feelings toward Fred.

Daphne was voiced by Stefanianna Christopherson from 1969 to 1970. She was replaced by Heather North who would voice Daphne until 1997 and again for the two direct-to-DVD movies, Scooby-Doo! and the Legend of the Vampire and Scooby-Doo! and the Monster of Mexico. Daphne was voiced by Mary Kay Bergman from 1998 to 2000. Daphne has been voiced by Grey DeLisle since 2001. In A Pup Named Scooby-Doo Daphne was voiced by Kellie Martin. She was portrayed by Sarah Michelle Gellar in the 2002-2004 live-action films and by Kate Melton in the 2009-2010 live-action telefilms.

Amanda Seyfried voices Daphne as an adult with Mckenna Grace as her younger self in the theatrical animated film Scoob!.

Velma Dinkley

Throughout her various incarnations, Velma is usually portrayed as a highly intelligent young woman with various interests ranging from highly specified sciences (which in the "Scooby and Scrappy-Doo" series leads her to pursue a career as a NASA research scientist) or merely being very well read on various and sometimes obscure information, such as ancient Viking writing (as in the third Scooby-Doo series "The New Scooby-Doo Mysteries"). In Scooby-Doo! Abracadabra-Doo, Velma is described by her younger sister Madelyn as being "born with a mystery book in her hand". Consequently, Velma is usually the one to figure out the mystery, sometimes with the help of Fred and Daphne.

In the first series, notably Where Are You! and New Movies, a running gag is Velma's severe near-sightedness and her trouble with keeping her glasses on her face (usually after falling off while being chased by the villain).

When Scooby is too afraid to volunteer to help with a mission, Velma often offers him a dog treat called a "Scooby Snack" as a bribe. Her catchphrases are: "Jinkies!" and "My glasses! I can't see without my glasses!"

Like all of the Scooby-Doo gang, later ret-conned as Mystery Incorporated members, Velma has differing personal backgrounds and histories depending on which series one is referring to.

In the original Where Are You! series, Velma attended the same high school as the rest of the gang (as stated in the episode "A Knight for a Night"). However, in the second series, The New Scooby-Doo Movies, Velma is said to have graduated from a different high school than her friends (as stated in the episode "Spirited Spooked Sports Show"). In the current series, Velma is stated to be a native of Ohio, unlike the other members of the gang. But on one occasion, she mentioned she's from Texas.

Velma was voiced by Nicole Jaffe from 1969 to 1973, who would voice the character again in the two direct-to-DVD movies, Scooby-Doo! and the Legend of the Vampire and Scooby-Doo! and the Monster of Mexico. Jaffe was later replaced by Pat Stevens, who would voice Velma from 1976 to 1979; Marla Frumkin replaced her from 1979-1980 and would voice the character again in 1984. Velma was voiced by B.J. Ward from 1997 to 2002, by Mindy Cohn from 2002-2015 and in A Pup Named Scooby-Doo, Velma was voiced by Christina Lange.  Starting with Be Cool, Scooby-Doo! (2015-2018), Velma has been voiced by Kate Micucci. Gina Rodriguez voiced Velma as an adult with Ariana Greenblatt voicing her younger self in the animated theatrical film Scoob!. She was portrayed by Linda Cardellini in the 2002-2004 live-action films.

Secondary characters introduced in The Scooby-Doo Show/Scooby-Doo and Scrappy-Doo

Scrappy-Doo

Scrappy-Doo was added to the cast of Scooby-Doo to save the series' ratings, which by 1979 had begun to sink to the point of cancellation threats from ABC. After his addition to the show proved to be a ratings success, Hanna-Barbera restructured the show around Scrappy in 1980. The original format of four teenagers and their dog(s) solving supernatural mysteries for a half-hour was eschewed for simpler, more comedic adventures which involved real supernatural villains (the villains in previous Scooby episodes were almost always regular humans in disguise).

Scrappy remained an integral part of the Scooby-Doo franchise, on both television and in Scooby-related licensed products and merchandising, through the end of the 1980s. He was also briefly the star of his own seven-minute shorts — the Scrappy and Yabba Doo segments of The Scooby & Scrappy-Doo/Puppy Hour. Teamed with his uncle Yabba-Doo and Deputy Dusty, he helped maintain law and order in a small town in the American west. In later years, the presence of Scrappy-Doo has been criticized as having had a negative effect on the various Scooby-Doo series of the 1980s. However, the gradual decline of Scooby-Doo has been credited to other factors as well, such as changes in format. Scrappy-Doo has become the symbol of an irritatingly overexuberant or cute character added to a series in an attempt to maintain ratings, a phenomenon also known as Cousin Oliver Syndrome. Due to the general perception of the character by audiences, Scrappy-Doo has not appeared in any Scooby-related spinoffs since the made-for-television movie Scooby-Doo and the Reluctant Werewolf in 1988, with four exceptions:

In the first live-action Scooby-Doo theatrical film — where Scrappy played a decidedly negative role, wanting revenge on Mystery Inc. for abandoning him years ago (he was kicked out for continuously urinating on Daphne, being obnoxious, and the final straw was when he tried to vote himself as the leader of Mystery Inc.). When Velma is talking to a guy at the bar who likes her, she tells him that Scrappy was not a puppy, but had a glandular disorder. Although he nearly succeeds in performing the 'Darkopolypse Ritual', which would give a group of demons the power to rule Earth for the next ten thousand years, his plan is foiled and he and his minions are arrested because he underestimated the Mystery Inc. team, inviting them all to the theme park where he was conducting the ritual after they broke up years before simply to make them witness his triumph when he only needed Scooby present, intending to use Scooby's 'pure' soul to complete his ritual. At the conclusion of the film, Velma says that Scrappy's full name is Scrappy Cornelius Doo.

Scooby-Doo! and the Goblin King (2008) has a scene where a monstrous Mystery Machine crashes through a carnival stand containing dolls of Scrappy, and running over them. Like all the previous direct-to-video movies, Scrappy never made an appearance.

Scooby-Doo! Mystery Incorporated (2010), in the episode "The Siren's Song", Fred and Daphne come across a statue of Scrappy in the Crystal Cove Haunted Museum among the statues of their defeated foes. Daphne remarks it's been awhile since she's seen him before Fred pulls her away, reminding her they all promised never to speak of him again.

Scrappy was voiced by Lennie Weinrib from 1979 to 1980. He was replaced by Don Messick who would voice him from 1980 to 1988. In the first live action theatrical movie he was voiced by Scott Innes. Innes also voiced Scrappy in the episode Shaggy Busted from Harvey Birdman, Attorney at Law.

Scooby-Dum
Scooby-Dum is a supporting character in The Scooby Doo Show, voiced by Daws Butler. Scooby-Dum, a gray Merle Great Dane with spots and buck teeth is Scooby-Doo's dim-witted cousin (his lineage is dubious because Shaggy has said that he is his brother on one occasion but also his cousin, though it is most likely that they are cousins). Dum lives with Ma and Pa Skillet, in the Okefenokee swamp of southern Georgia. Whenever Doo and Dum greet each other, Scooby-Doo yells, "Scooby, Dooby, Dooby, Dum" and Scooby-Dum says, "Scooby, doobie, doo." They then do a special handshake involving two high fives. Whenever he hears the word "Clue", Scooby-Dum invariably pulls out a magnifying glass and, intoning the opening four notes of Beethoven's Fifth Symphony, chants, "Dum, dum, dum, DUM!", even after a mystery is solved. The inclusion of Scooby-Dum is considered one of the first missteps in Scooby-Doo cartoons.

In Laff-a-Lympics, Scooby-Dum is also a teammate for the Scooby Doobies.

Yabba-Doo
Yabba-Doo is a white Great Dane. His adventures take place out west, where he fights crime with his master, a bumbling deputy named Deputy Dusty, and his enthusiastic nephew Scrappy-Doo. In contrast to Scooby's catchphrase of "Scooby-Dooby-Doo!", Yabba's was "Yippity-Yabbity-Doo!" (and not "Yabba-Dabba-Doo!", presumably because of Fred Flintstone's use of that particular catchphrase). Yabba is voiced by Don Messick. Dusty is voiced by Frank Welker.

Scooby-Dee
Scooby-Dee is a female Great Dane, with white fur, first appearing in The Scooby-Doo Show. She was a character in the episode titled "The Chiller Diller Movie Thriller", as a distant cousin of Scooby's, who helped them solve the mystery. She also has cameo appearances in the second-season episode of What's New, Scooby-Doo?, "Homeward Hound", where she is one of many dogs seen at the dog show the gang is attending. She is seen walking past the screen in two separate scenes in the beginning.

Scooby-Dee was meant to return to The Scooby-Doo Show as a girlfriend to Scooby-Doo, but the show ended before that could happen. Scooby-Dee was voiced by Janet Waldo, better known to many viewers as the voice of Judy Jetson.

Introduced in The 13 Ghosts of Scooby-Doo

Vincent Van Ghoul
In The 13 Ghosts of Scooby-Doo, Vincent Van Ghoul is a renowned magician and warlock, with extensive knowledge of the supernatural. He is first visited by Shaggy, Scooby, Daphne and Scrappy with Flim-Flam, after they need some help with their plane, which has crash-landed in a nearby temple in Tibet. After Shaggy and Scooby unwittingly unleash thirteen terrible ghosts from the chest in which they were locked, Van Ghoul tells them that they must trap them again. In the show's opening, a terrified Shaggy moans "Why us?", to which Van Ghoul replies "Because you let them out!"

Despite being very angry with the pair for unleashing the ghosts, he agrees to help them in their ghost-questing, and gives the group a crystal ball through which he can contact them. He shares personality traits with his voice actor, Vincent Price, like having a very morbid and dark sense of humour.

In Scooby-Doo! Mystery Incorporated, Van Ghoul is an actor who does horror films (much like Vincent Price, who was the inspiration for his character). He is constantly referenced and glimpses of his movies can be seen throughout the series (according to Shaggy he has done more than 400 movies). He makes a full appearance in the episode "Nightfright", when Shaggy and Scooby win an essay contest to have dinner with him, and later in the episode "Theater of Doom", where he directs the production of Crystal Cove's theatre stage of the legend of Friar Serra and his faithful donkey Porto, who supposedly saved many inhabitants from a tsunami that destroyed Crystal Cove.

In The 13 Ghosts of Scooby-Doo, Van Ghoul is voiced by Vincent Price. In Scooby-Doo! Mystery Incorporated and Scooby-Doo! and the Curse of the 13th Ghost, Van Ghoul is voiced by Maurice LaMarche impersonating Price.

Flim Flam
Flim Flam was a part of the gang for all thirteen episodes of The 13 Ghosts of Scooby-Doo. A preteen Tibetan child, Film Flam is a con artist with the personality of an archetypical American used-car salesman. He is seen in the first episode, "To All the Ghouls I've Loved Before", trying to sell a magic concoction to a local town located in the Himalayan Mountains. However, he was kicked out of town, and managed to meet up with the current Scooby gang, who was trying to find the Mystery Machine (an airplane) hidden by Bogel and Weerd. He took them to a psychic (Vincent Van Ghoul) who could help the whole group find their mode of transportation, and warned them of ensuing danger. Daphne is a given a drink laced with wolfsbane due to the fact the townspeople believe that she overheard their secret, and when the night falls on the town, the group finds out that the whole town is actually a werewolf cult. They are pursued into the sewers, and Flim Flam opens one of his products to spray on Daphne, who reverts to normal. He goes on to cure the rest of the townspeople, who are ever grateful for the help. When Scrappy, Daphne and Flim Flam question them as to how they got that way in the first place, they are told that they were turned into werewolves as revenge for sealing the Thirteen Ghosts into the Chest of Demons, and the current group races to keep Shaggy and Scooby from opening the chest, but to no avail. After Shaggy and Scooby open the chest and release the thirteen ghosts within it, Flim Flam decides to join them in their hunt to return them to the chest.

In the Scooby-Doo! Mystery Incorporated episode "The Siren's Song", Fred and Daphne come across a statue of Flim Flam in the Crystal Cove Haunted Museum among the statues of their defeated foes. Daphne remarks that Flim Flam was arrested and received a harsh sentence of 25 years to life for being a juvenile con-artist (this was an inside joke; 25 years had passed between 13 Ghosts in 1985 and Mystery Incorporated in 2010). It is also referenced that Fred was away at trapping camp during the events of The 13 Ghosts of Scooby-Doo.

An older teen version of Flim Flam appears in the direct-to-video movie Scooby-Doo! and the Curse of the 13th Ghost.

Flim Flam is voiced by Susan Blu in the original series. In the direct-to-video movie Scooby-Doo! and the Curse of the 13th Ghost, Flim Flam is voiced by Noshir Dalal.

Weerd and Bogel
Bogel is a fat, dimwitted ghost while Weerd is a tall, skinny ghost. Weerd is the mastermind of the two. They both are recurring characters in the 13 Ghosts of Scooby-Doo and are first seen in the episode "To All the Ghouls I've Loved Before". Weerd comes up with a scheme to lure Shaggy and Scooby to open the Chest of Demons so he and Bogel can gain some glory with the 13 ghosts. In nearly every episode, Weerd and Bogel attempt to help out one of the chest escapees in fulfilling their master plan. Throughout the series, Weerd and Bogel try to get into S.A.P.S. (short for Spook and Poltergeist Society), a legion of high honor for the most terrifying ghosts and ghouls.

Weerd is voiced by Arte Johnson.
Bogel is voiced by Howard Morris.

13 Ghosts
The 13 Ghosts are a group of malevolent ghosts and demons that were imprisoned in the Chest of Demons. Weerd and Bogel tricked Shaggy and Scooby into opening the Chest of Demons to free them. Now it's up to Scooby-Doo and his friends to recapture the 13 Ghosts as they were the ones who let them out. During this time, Weerd and Bogel worked alongside the different 13 Ghosts to further their goals and reclaim the Chest of Demons to no avail.

The 13 Ghosts consist of:

 Maldor the Malevolent (voiced by Peter Cullen) - A ghostly warlock from the Dark Ages who is a master of the black arts.
 Queen Morbida (voiced by Linda Gary) - A vampire-like queen who is the commander of an army of monsters.
 Reflector Spectre (voiced by Michael Rye) - A mirror demon who can trap people in mirrors.
 Zomba (voiced by Susan Blu) - A zombie demon who can transport people into movies and TV shows.
 Captain Ferguson (voiced by Robert Ridgely) - A ghostly sea captain and his crew who haunted the Bermuda Triangle on his ghost ship.
 Nekara (voiced by Linda Gary) - An enchantress who can drain other magic users of their magic with her Trance of Love.
 Marcella (voiced by B.J. Ward) - A witch who manipulated three bumbling witches called the Brewski Sisters into freeing her.
 Time Slime (voiced by Robert Ridgely) - A demon who can control the flow of time.
 Demondo (voiced by Michael Rye) - A demon who can imprison people in books and comic strips.
 Rankor (voiced by Hamilton Camp) - A vampire demon who sought to join S.A.P.S. by having Vincent Van Ghoul look into the Eye of Eternity which slowly turned him to stone.
 Professor Phantazmo (voiced by Alan Oppenheimer) - The ringmaster of the Circus of Horrors which is staffed by demons and monsters.
 Zimbulu (voiced by Peter Cullen in his true form, Edie McClurg in human form) - A horned lion demon with goat-like hooves who posed as a medium named Tallulah.

The film Scooby-Doo! and the Curse of the 13th Ghost features the 13th Ghost named Asmodeus who had eluded Scooby-Doo. Mystery Inc. reunites with Vincent van Ghoul and Flim Flam to catch Asmodeus. Asmodeus' history was the he was originally Vincent Van Ghoul's ancestor Asamad Van Ghoul. Vincent's friend Mortifer Quinch (voiced by Nolan North) impersonated Asmodeus in a plot to make a profit from the Chest of Demons only to be thwarted by Mystery Inc. The real Asmodeus appeared and resumed his true form of Asamad Van Ghoul as Velma figured out that Asamad was trying to keep Vincent safe. This was a ruse by Velma which she secretly told to Flim Flam.

Introduced in Scooby-Doo and the Witch's Ghost

The Hex Girls

The Hex Girls are an eco-goth rock band consisting of members Thorn (Sally McKnight), Dusk, and Luna. Thorn is voiced by Jennifer Hale, Dusk is voiced by Jane Wiedlin and Luna is voiced by Kimberly Brooks. They are first seen as suspects of the mystery that is going on in their hometown, Oakhaven, later becoming the gang's friends. They first appeared in Scooby-Doo! and the Witch's Ghost, and reappeared in Scooby-Doo! and the Legend of the Vampire, What's New, Scooby-Doo? and Scooby-Doo! Mystery Incorporated.

In the movie Scooby-Doo! and the Witch's Ghost, they are first seen as suspects of the mystery the gang is investigating. Thorn later plays an important role on Sarah Ravencroft's ghost demise by reading the spell which sends her back to the spell book where she came from, along with her descendant Ben Ravencroft. Along with Scooby and the rest of the gang, they end up giving a concert to pay for the damage the Ravencrofts did.

In Scooby-Doo! and the Legend of the Vampire, Thorn, Luna and Dusk are the artists that are going to open the Vampire Rock Musical Festival, ending up being kidnapped by Yowie Yahoo's vampire minions, which leads the gang to look for them, while trying to solve the mystery regarding Vampire Rock. They end up being saved, and accompany the gang to their performance at the festival.

In the series What's New, Scooby-Doo?, they appear in the episode "The Vampire Strikes Back", where the gang must help them capture a vampire that has been trying to scare them away from a castle in Transylvania, where they are shooting their latest single. According to Daphne, Dusk intended to leave the group to start a solo career, but this wasn't brought up again with the episode's ending implying she chose to stay.

In Scooby-Doo! Mystery Incorporated, they appear in the episodes "In Fear of the Phantom" and "Dance of the Undead". They ask the gang to help them catch a ghost who wants to put them out of business after Thorn is nearly crushed to death. After most of Crystal Cove is hypnotized by a zombie ska band, Scooby and Shaggy track them down and ask them for help to defeat them in a battle of the bands. They also help the gang find another clue of the Crystal Cove Mystery, by discovering and deciphering a hidden soundtrack in the Planispheric Disk.

Introduced in A Pup Named Scooby-Doo

Red Herring
Red Herring is a neighborhood bully from the gang's hometown in A Pup Named Scooby-Doo. Fred Jones is constantly having a feud with him and always blaming Red for the crime almost automatically because of an incident when they were babies and Red tried to frighten them (which he repeatedly does throughout the entire series) but he fails and is caught. In the episode, "Night of the Boogey Biker", Red is in fact behind the crime, but Fred was unable to accuse him because of a bet he made with Daphne earlier on in the episode, where he would not be allowed to accuse Red of a crime for 24 hours. This would be the only episode that would have Red as the criminal.  Red is short, chubby, has curly red hair and normally wears a green vest over a white shirt, blue pants, and cowboy boots. Among his catchphrases are "HAH! What a weenie!", "That's not very funny" and "I didn't do it, Jones!" His name is a reference to the idiom "red herring".

Red Herring is voiced by Scott Menville.

Introduced in Scooby-Doo! Mystery Incorporated

Sheriff Bronson Stone
Sheriff Bronson Stone is the sheriff of Crystal Cove in Scooby-Doo! Mystery Incorporated. He doesn't like the gang because they get in his way of solving crimes, although he turns towards them when he's in a jam. He acts as an authority figure for the kids. He had a close relationship with Mayor Fred Jones Sr. until he found out that Jones was the Freak of Crystal Cove and stopped talking to him. He felt he deserved to become mayor after Jones was arrested and is cold to Mayor Janet Nettles in the second-season premiere. Sheriff Stone is normally seen in uniform and is very rarely seen in other outfits. He wears a brown hat and sheriff's uniform and has a mustache. His actual first name is Sheriff, as his mother thought that he was destined to be one. Besides himself, Sheriff Stone also looks up to Iron Will Williamson (who was later nicknamed "Dead Justice") and, before he was found out to be the Freak of Crystal Cove, Mayor Fred Jones Sr.

When the new mayor, Janet Nettles, arrived in Crystal Cove, he felt that he should be the new mayor, and acted cold towards her, only to end up falling in love with her and beginning a steady relationship with her. In the restored world he and Janet are married with four children named Eastwood, Norris, Billy Jack, and Lynda Carter.

Sheriff Bronson Stone is voiced by Patrick Warburton.

Hot Dog Water (Marcie Fleach)
Hot Dog Water, real name Marcie Fleach, is an inhabitant of Crystal Cove and a recurring character in Scooby-Doo! Mystery Incorporated. She is first introduced in the episode "Where Walks Aphrodite" as a cameo and later has a voice cameo in the episode "The Dragon's Secret", and would make her full-fledged episode debut in "Menace of the Manticore", serving as the titular villain. She would later return in the episode "The House of the Nightmare Witch", out on parole and working with Velma and Mr. E. to find the third piece of the Planispheric Disc. She joins Mystery Incorporated as Daphne's temporary replacement in the same episode, only to leave in "Web of the Dreamweaver" following Daphne's return in the preceding episode, though Velma wanted her to stay. She subsequently made a cameo appearance in "The Hodag of Horror", and as the costumed villain in "The Night on Haunted Mountain". She makes another cameo in "Wrath of the Krampus".

Hot Dog Water has been Velma's rival for years, as the two girls have competed several times in the science fairs in Crystal Cove and Velma has mostly won. However, their rivalry seems to have faded and has become a friendship as a result of their partnership while working for Mr. E. They remain, friends, even after she leaves Mystery Incorporated, and Hot Dog Water claims Velma is the only real friend she's ever had. In "Wrath of the Krampus", Velma mentions that she still knows how to get in touch with her and she helps the gang by stealing the three pieces of the Planispheric disc from Mr. E's hiding place.

She has claimed to be smarter than Velma, as she concocted a "super helium" during an experiment in which she was testing the metal from the roller coasters at her father's theme park so she could be a manticore. She also has high computer skills, which she uses to make fake advertisement sites, as well as accurate financial pie charts, though she cannot figure out the traps surrounding the piece of the Planispheric Disc in the ship during the episode "The Night on Haunted Mountain", and causes the events to trick the gang, mainly Fred, into investigating the attack on Fred's friends, so Fred can trip the traps for her.

In "Through the Curtain", Hot Dog Water is taken hostage by Professor Pericles and he uses her as leverage to threaten the new Mystery Incorporated. However, Hot Dog Water breaks free and threatens to hurt Pericles, allowing her friends to escape. She is soon thwarted and shot by the Kriegstaffelbots, but her death was reversed in "Come Undone" — in the alternate universe created by the gang after destroying the Evil Entity, Marcie and Velma are teammates and work together to win the science fairs mentioned in "Menace of the Manticore".

She is normally seen with messy, long brown hair, red slim-framed glasses, a skirt, striped shirt with a jacket over top, and has a messy look about her. She smells of "hot dog water", hints to where she got her nickname, which her father reveals in "Menace of the Manticore" to be a result of her and her entire family bathing in recycled water previously used to boil hot dogs.

It was revealed by Warner Bros animator Tony Cervone on Instagram that writers of Scooby-Doo! Mystery Incorporated intended for Velma and Marcie to be in a romantic relationship.

Hot Dog Water is voiced by Linda Cardellini, who played Velma in the two live-action theatrical films.

Mayor Fred Jones Sr.
Mayor Fred Jones Sr., was the mayor of Crystal Cove for the first season and is Fred's father. He is proud of Crystal Cove being named the "Most Haunted Place on Earth", and uses it to attract tourism. This is why he doesn't approve of his son solving mysteries and proving the monsters to be faked. He doesn't understand Fred's obsession with solving mysteries and building traps and is usually discouraging him. He has a tendency to blurt out alliterative phrases when startled, usually by Fred. Later in the season, he is shown with a piece of the Planispheric Disc. This leads Fred to wonder and investigate who his father really is. In the first-season finale, it is revealed that Mayor Jones is the Freak of Crystal Cove and that he had adopted Fred so he could use him to keep his real parents (Brad Chiles and Judy Reeves of the original Mystery Incorporated) from returning to Crystal Cove. He is arrested and forced out of office. His successor is Janet Nettles, who is the polar opposite of Jones, calling upon the Gang for assistance in various mysteries.

He appears in the "Wrath of Krampus" as one of the gang's former enemies they enlist to help them in the plan to steal the remaining pieces of the Planispheric Disc from the original Mystery Incorporated. Despite his past betrayal, Fred says he was more than happy to help in the plan. He guards the gang's pieces of the disc during the events of the episode and returns them after they retrieved the other three pieces.

In "Nightmare in Red" the gang encounters his good half trapped in the waiting room, a supernatural prison for the good elements of those corrupted by the curse. While Nibiru had made Fred Sr. cold and unfeeling to Fred, his good half admits that Fred was the best thing in his life and he always thought him as his real son and was proud of him.

In the alternate timeline created by the gang after destroying the Evil Entity, he is the principal and soccer coach of Crystal Cove High School and admits to Fred that he had been special to him.

Mayor Jones is voiced by Gary Cole.

Mayor Janet Nettles
Mayor Janet Nettles is the successor to Mayor Fred Jones Sr. after he is arrested for being The Freak of Crystal Cove. She first appears in the episode "The Night the Clown Cried", where she is approached by a mysterious figure, who later turns out to be Velma in disguise, to retrieve Scooby, Shaggy and Fred to help save Crystal Cove from Crybaby Clown.

She is the second person, aside from Angel Dynamite (Cassidy Williams), to support the gang in their mystery-solving choice and even gives them an office, though it turns out to be the old janitor's closet, in the town hall. She is later revealed to be in a relationship with Sheriff Bronson Stone, although at the beginning Sheriff Bronson Stone is not thrilled that he was tossed over to be mayor for Nettles. The two are constantly seen out on dates throughout the second season. In "Dark Night of the Hunters" she sent an old colleague to follow the gang where she reveals (to her embarrassment) that she had a nightmare to help the gang retrieve The Heart of the Jaguar and return them safely to Crystal Cove.

At the end of the second season, in the alternate timeline created by the gang after destroying the Evil Entity, she is shown to be married to Sheriff Bronson Stone with four children, three sons and one daughter, of whom Daphne often babysits.

Mayor Janet Nettles is voiced by Kate Higgins.

Ed Machine
Ed Machine is the CEO of Destroido Corp. and the henchman of Mr. E. Ed first appears at the end of the episode, "The Legend of Alice May", where he released Alice May from her cell and asked if the plan was a success, while taking her to a car, Alice asks why it was such an elaborate plan. Ed tells her she was only paid for a job by his employer, Mr. E, and hasn't earned an explanation. After they had a quick chat, he watched her leave in the limousine. He is killed by Professor Pericles in "All Fear the Freak" in order to "send a message" to Mr. E.

Ed Machine is voiced by Richard McGonagle.

The Original "Mystery Incorporated"

Mr. E (Ricky Owens)
Mr. E (a play on "mystery") is a mysterious figure that gives clues to the gang throughout the first season. He doesn't reveal his face, or true identity to the gang, but helps them solve their mysteries while giving them cryptic clues to solve the mystery of the truth behind the Curse of Crystal Cove. These clues lead them to find out about a cursed Conquistador treasure, the secret history of Crystal Cove's founding Darrow Family, and the unsolved disappearance of the original Mystery Incorporated. Towards the end of the first season, he is revealed to be Ricky Owens, who was part of the original Mystery Incorporated and the owner of evil megacorporation Destroido. He is Shaggy's old Mystery Incorporated counterpart, and used to be skinny like Shaggy, but ends up overweight and wearing a long dark coat. Mr. E owns a van called the "Enigma Machine", an all-black counterpart to the Mystery Machine.

It is unknown if Mr. E is a friend or foe to the new Mystery Incorporated as he has, on several occasions throughout the series, helped them to solve many of their mysteries by giving them cryptic clues. But during the events of both "The Legend of Alice May" and "Pawn of Shadows", he has caused the mysteries the gang has solved using Alice May both times, first to retrieve an old Crystal Cove High School yearbook for the gang to find out about the original Mystery Incorporated, and the second time to use them as "parrot bait" to get Professor Pericles to come to help the kids out of the danger from the Obliteratrix in order to obtain his piece of the Planispheric Disc that he had taken from Mayor Fred Jones Sr.

In the episode "The Gathering Gloom" it is revealed how Ricky Owens and Professor Pericles met. Professor Pericles had crash-landed in Ricky Owens' front yard when he was a child and was injured. Ricky took Professor Pericles in and nursed him back to health and when Ricky went to set him free, Professor Pericles took off but immediately returned to stay with Ricky. Also during the episode, the two pair up once again to go after "the Treasure". At the end of the second season, in the alternate universe created by the gang after destroying the Evil Entity, Ricky Owens is shown to no longer be Mr. E and is a lot like his younger self. He is also happily married to Cassidy Williams and the two work together with Pericles at a new environmentally-friendly version of Destroido called Creationex.

 Mr. E is voiced by Lewis Black, except in the episode "Scarebear" where he was temporarily voiced by Jeff Bennett. His younger self is voiced by Scott Menville.

Angel Dynamite (Cassidy Williams)
Cassidy Williams, alias Angel Dynamite, is a citizen of Crystal Cove and a recurring character in Scooby-Doo! Mystery Incorporated, as well as one of the original members of Mystery Incorporated. She first appears in "Beware the Beast from Below" as a radio DJ for Crystal Cove's K-Ghoul radio station. Before she is revealed to be Cassidy Williams, she is a friend of Scooby and the gang and is the only inhabitant of Crystal Cove who supports them as mystery-solvers.

After she is revealed, she is shown to be working with Mr. E, who has been hinted as, while she was still a member of Mystery Incorporated, once being her boyfriend, this is later confirmed in "The Midnight Zone". Upon his return to Crystal Cove, Mr. E also brought Cassidy along with him to help him seek out the Planispheric Disc and get revenge on Professor Pericles, as well as to help him keep an eye on the new Mystery Incorporated. Although she works with Mr. E, Cassidy is shown to have a great deal of concern and care for the gang. After she reveals her side of the reason why the original Mystery Incorporated left, the gang turn on her and no longer trust her as she had "been lying...since the beginning." When the Freak attacks Shaggy and Scooby at their home she and Ed Machine bring the gang to the radio station where she tries to comfort and give shelter to the gang only to have them lock her in her own booth. After attempting to contact Ed to let him know what has happened, she contacts Sheriff Bronson Stone and informs him of where the gang has gone and after rescuing her, she goes after them to make sure they are okay. During the first season of Mystery Incorporated, she is seen with a 70's type outfit, with short black hair, green bell-bottoms, green tanktop-ish type shirt, and platform shoes, as well as green eyeliner.

In the second season of Mystery Incorporated, Cassidy is no longer working with Mr. E and during the events of "The Night the Clown Cried II - Tears of Doom!", Mr. E seeks her out and tells her "It would be the perfect time to get close to the kids again," but she refuses and states that she is no longer Angel Dynamite but just "Cassidy Williams," and tells him that she won't hurt the gang again. She also changes her look during the second season and applies new makeup and sports a trench coat and normal jeans and shoes. She begs to Brad and Judy, Fred's real parents, to stop hunting for the Conquistador treasure and to put Fred first but when they refuse she returns to K-Ghoul to start revealing the secrets of the Conquistador treasure and the curse of Crystal Cove. This has put her into real danger as Professor Pericles states to Mr. E at the end of "The Gathering Gloom" that "she will have to be silenced forever". She also begins spying on Brad and Judy. During the events of "Night Terrors", Cassidy is setting up the pictures of the Darrow family as a clue for Velma in her room to help her solve the mystery of the past mystery-solvers in Crystal Cove, including the original Mystery Incorporated, all of whom have vanished throughout the city's history. She is presumed to be dead after the events of the episode, "The Midnight Zone", and it is shown that the gang regrets not reconciling with her beforehand. It is never truly revealed if she did die or just went into deep hiding. In the episode "Nightmare in Red", Cassidy is in the room of those who had been affected by the Curse of Crystal Cove, but unlike many around her, with the exception of Fred Jones Sr., she is not her younger self, like Ricky Owens, Professor Pericles, etc. but is seen as an older self in the second season after changing her look. At the end of the second season, in the alternate universe created by the gang after destroying the Evil Entity, Cassidy is shown to be alive and well and happily married to Ricky Owens.

The younger version of herself is seen constantly throughout the first season of the series. Her younger self sported a more innocent look, with bow-ties holding up her pigtails and sporting a yellow dress. She also wore glasses.

Cassidy Williams is voiced by Vivica A. Fox and her younger self is voiced by Kimberly Brooks.

Professor Pericles
Professor Pericles was the mascot of the original Mystery Incorporated, and the series main villain. A talking parrot of incredible intelligence with a German accent, he is also a sinister and highly manipulative sociopath, caring only for his own gain. Professor Pericles at first is only referenced in the series by a picture that has him circled in red marker. He makes his full-fledged appearance in the episode "Howl of the Fright Hound" where he is imprisoned in Crystal Cove's Animal Asylum. When the gang comes to visit Scooby, who is being framed for being the "Fright Hound", Daphne's locket opens of its own accords and begins playing the tune within it. Professor Pericles responds to this as he recognizes the tune. When the gang go to investigate him, he gives Fred a warning to "Beware those who are closest to you". He escapes and Mr. E sends Velma a text message telling the gang to follow him. It is later revealed by Mayor Fred Jones Sr. in the episode "All Fear the Freak", that he and Professor Pericles struck a deal to search for the Planispheric Disc together and helped him to chase the original Mystery Incorporated out of Crystal Cove but Jones Sr. betrayed Professor Pericles and drugged him to render him unconscious and had Professor Pericles locked up. This also explains Mr. E's statement in the episode "Menace of the Manticore", about how Scooby is a more "trustworthy companion" to Shaggy than Pericles was to him.

Professor Pericles is also behind two of the mysteries in Crystal Cove, as he aided Amanda Smythe in the episode "Where Walks Aphrodite", where he uses the events to obtain objects he needed to help him retrieve what he needs for his quest for the Conquistador treasure. He is also the Shadowy Figure in the episode "A Haunting in Crystal Cove", where he hacks Fred's laptop to "scare" the location of Fred Jones Sr.'s piece of the Planispheric Disc out of him, which he succeeds in doing and he takes off with it. At the end of the first season, Pericles has two pieces of the disc and Scooby vows to get him once he reunites the broken-up Mystery Incorporated.

In the second season of Mystery Incorporated, Professor Pericles does not return until "The Hodag of Horror", where he has an unknown proposition for the original members of Mystery Incorporated which involves the new Mystery Incorporated since they have now retrieved two pieces of the Planispheric Disc. During "The Gathering Gloom" Professor Pericles admits to trying to reunite the original Mystery Incorporated only to be rejected by them and turns to Mr. E in hopes that, due to their strong bond in the past, he will help him.  Mr. E initially refused, citing Pericles's betrayal of him and the Original Mystery Incorporated. By the end of the episode, however, Mr. E does join forces with Pericles.  The two manage to recruit Brad Chiles and Judy Reeves, Fred's real parents, to their cause. Pericles becomes more depraved as the series draws to its close as he works to free his "master", the Evil Entity, in hopes of becoming all-powerful in exchange for releasing the Entity. Pericles succeeds in freeing the Entity when Nibiru comes, and volunteers to serve as the Entity's physical host. However, Pericles learns to his horror too late that he has to die for the Entity to take over. Pericles' body is disfigured and remolded to serve as the Evil Entity's form until its defeat. In the alternate universe created by the gang after destroying the Evil Entity, he is shown to be the mascot for Ricky and Cassidy's environmentally-friendly company, Creationex. He is also shown without his scar and his personality has changed into a happy and kind bird.

Professor Pericles is voiced by Udo Kier.

Brad Chiles and Judy Reeves
Bradley "Brad" Chiles and his wife Judy Reeves are members of the original Mystery Incorporated and the birth parents of Fredrick Jones Jr. When Mayor Fred Jones Sr. abducts Fred to keep Brad and Judy from returning to Crystal Cove, the two continue to live their lives under secret identities for as the famous Sternum and Sternum, a couple who invent traps and help mystery solvers. Upon Mayor Jones' arrest, the two return to Crystal Cove apparently to reunite with Fred, but are really after the Conquistador treasure and have no care or concern for their son. They also have a dog named Nova, whom Scooby is instantly smitten with. They are Fred and Daphne's old Mystery Incorporated counterparts, respectively.

They first appear in the episode "The Hodag of Horror" but their younger selves are occasionally seen throughout the first season. Brad's younger self wears a sports jacket, has blonde hair identical to Fred's, and has freckles on his face but has the same face, chin, jawline, and body outline as Fred, his older self however does not have freckles and he has white hair. Judy's younger self is shown to have long blonde hair and wearing a white shirt with orange ruffs and tan pants, whereas her present-day self sports short blond hair and a rich look about her.

The two eventually re-team up with Mr. E and Professor Pericles to help the two obtain the three pieces of the Planispheric Disc from the gang, as well as get their hands on the cursed Conquistador treasure beneath Crystal Cove.

In "Wrath of the Krampus", Fred makes it clear that he had known that they were only after the pieces of the disc and appeared hurt by their betrayal. Fred even makes it clear that he preferred Fred Jones Sr. over them. Upon the revealing of their betrayal, the gang takes Nova with them with Scooby stating that Brad and Judy "do not deserve" her.

In the episode "The Man in the Mirror", Professor Pericles does plastic surgery on Brad and Judy to have Brad look identical to their son and Judy as an older version of Daphne. They remain like this for the remaining episodes until the alternate universe is created.

At the end of the second season, in the alternate universe created by the gang after destroying the Evil Entity, Brad and Judy have been returned to their original look. They raised Fred, have never been trap experts, and are obstetricians instead.

Brad Chiles is voiced by Tim Matheson and his younger self is voiced by Nolan North.
Judy Reeves is voiced by Tia Carrere and her younger self is voiced by Kari Wahlgren.

Nova
Nova is a female Cocker Spaniel and the pet dog of Brad Chiles and Judy Reeves who appears in the second season of the series. She became the object of Scooby-Doo's affections. She was captured by the Hodag of Horror and saved by the gang. When the gang finds out about Brad and Judy's true intentions, they secretly take Nova behind their back because "they weren't good enough for her."

In the episode "The Horrible Herd", Nova is seriously injured after she falls from a helicopter during the final encounter with the Horrible Herd and she is put into a hospital. Scooby visits her frequently, but during one of his visits, she dies.

After her death interdimensional creatures called Anunnakis possessed her and spoke through her mind, telling the gang about the Evil Entity. She also tells them that the only way to save Crystal Cove is to find the Heart of the Jaguar, and destroy the sarcophagus containing the Evil Entity.

After the Evil Entity is destroyed, in the new timeline, while the gang is going to the Miskatonic University, Nova is still possessed by the Anunnaki and thanks Scooby for his heroic actions.

Nova is voiced by Jennifer Hale, and when she is possessed she is voiced by Amy Acker.

Alice May
Alice is a recurring character in season 1 of Scooby-Doo! Mystery Incorporated who first appears in the episode "The Legend of Alice May". In the episode, she disguises herself as a ghost girl in an elaborate scheme to get a yearbook to the gang for her employer, Mr. E, while using the disguise of the ghost girl to distract the gang whilst she hid the yearbook for them to find. Alice later appeared again in the penultimate episode of Season 1, "Pawn of Shadows" where she took on the disguise of The Obliteratrix, an assassin sent to destroy Mystery Incorporated under direct orders from Mr. E, but she has later locked up again in prison after her defeat and capture.

Alice also has a non-speaking appearance in the second-season episode "Wrath of the Krampus," where she appears in the Crystal Cove prison.

 Alice May is voiced by Hynden Walch.

The Evil Entity
The Evil Entity is the overarching villain of the series. He is an evil Anunnaki that was imprisoned for many centuries within a crystal sarcophagus, buried beneath Crystal Cove. Like other benevolent members of its race, he came to Earth thousands of years ago at the time of Nibiru, when an alignment weakened the barriers between dimensions and allowed them to cross over. While the other Anunnaki sought to help humankind grow, the Evil Entity desired only destruction and he was imprisoned into a crystal sarcophagus by the other Anunnaki. While imprisoned, the entity attempted to manipulate many mystery solvers throughout the centuries in hopes of setting him free.

After he is freed by Professor Pericles, the Entity intended to possess Scooby-Doo as his physical vessel, but he manages to break free. Pericles insists that he forgets about possessing Scooby and offered himself to the entity as a willing host instead, in which the Entity agrees. Taking Pericles' body and killing him in the process, the Entity assumes a physical form becoming a giant parrot-faced three-horned with a squid-like body and tentacles and then devours Brad, Judy, and Mr. E. Later, it set about consuming Crystal Cove's citizens before it went on to consuming galaxies. It also calls other evil Anunnakis from its sarcophagus and orders them to catch Crystal Cove inhabitants for him. The Mystery Incorporated kids realize that, unlike other mystery-solving members of groups forged by the Entity, their friendship was strong, as the Hunters of Secrets before them. Their love for each other helps Mystery Incorporated destroy the Evil Entity, creating an alternate timeline in which Crystal Cove is entitled the "Sunniest Place on Earth."

The Evil Entity is voiced by Clancy Brown, except in the episode "Wrath of the Krampus" where he is voiced by Frank Welker.

References 

 
Characters
Television characters introduced in 1969
Hanna-Barbera characters
Scooby-Doo